The Münchhausen Prize was instituted in 1997, the 200th anniversary of the death of Baron von Münchhausen. It is awarded in May each year in Bodenwerder, the Baron's hometown, for special talent in the art of speaking or presentation, either in literature or the visual arts, fantasy and satire, in the sense of the Baron. The prize money is €2,556.

Recipients
Source:

1997: Dieter Hildebrandt
1998: Wolfgang Völz
1999: Werner Schneyder
2000: Norbert Blüm
2001: Ephraim Kishon
2002: Evelyn Hamann
2003: Bruno Jonas
2004: Wolfgang Stumph
2005: Rudi Carrell
2006: Günter Willumeit
2007: Tony Marshall
2008: Jürgen von der Lippe
2009: Emil Steinberger
2010: Götz Alsmann
2011: Eckart von Hirschhausen
2012: Herman van Veen
2013: Frank Elstner
2014: Dieter Hallervorden
2015: Annette Frier
2016: Dieter Nuhr
2018: Christoph Maria Herbst

References

External links
 

Awards established in 1997
Baron Munchausen